Ruth Elizabeth Davidson, Baroness Davidson of Lundin Links (born 10 November 1978), is a Scottish politician who served as Leader of the Scottish Conservative Party from 2011 to 2019 and Leader of the Scottish Conservative Party in the Scottish Parliament from 2020 to 2021. She served as a Member of the Scottish Parliament (MSP) for Glasgow from 2011 to 2016 and for Edinburgh Central from 2016 to 2021.

Born in Edinburgh, Davidson was raised in Selkirk and later attended Buckhaven High School in Fife. After graduating from the University of Edinburgh, she worked as a BBC journalist and served in the Territorial Army as a signaller. After leaving the BBC in 2009 to study at the University of Glasgow, she joined the Conservative Party. She was the party's candidate in the Glasgow North East constituency at a 2009 by-election and at the 2010 general election, finishing in third then fourth place, on each occasion with approximately 5% of the vote.

At the 2011 Scottish Parliament election, Davidson stood in the Glasgow Kelvin constituency, where she finished fourth, and on the Glasgow regional list, from which she was elected. Following party leader Annabel Goldie's resignation in May 2011, Davidson stood in the subsequent leadership election. She won the contest and was declared party leader on 4 November 2011. In 2016, the Conservatives replaced the Labour Party as the second-largest party in the Scottish Parliament. As Scottish Conservative leader, she was considered by some to be a potential candidate for leadership of the British Conservative Party although ruled herself out of running for the position.

Davidson resigned the leadership in August 2019, shortly after Boris Johnson became Prime Minister of the United Kingdom. She was succeeded by her deputy leader of eight years, Jackson Carlaw who was in turn replaced by Douglas Ross. Davidson led the party in Holyrood for the remainder of the 2016–2021 Parliament. At the 2021 Scottish Parliament election, Davidson stood down as an MSP in preparation to enter the House of Lords and become a life peer.

Early life and career 
Davidson was born at Edinburgh Royal Maternity Hospital and Simpson Memorial Maternity Pavilion in Edinburgh. She was raised in Selkirk and later in Fife. Her family lived in Bridgelands Road, Selkirk, and Davidson attended Knowepark Primary School until Primary 3. Her father, Douglas, a mill manager at Laidlaw & Fairgrieve, had played professional football for Partick Thistle F.C. in his younger days and was a midfielder for Selkirk F.C. during the late-1970s and early-1980s. When her father took a job in the whisky industry, the family left the Borders for Fife, where she attended the state secondary Buckhaven High School.

Davidson studied English literature at the University of Edinburgh, gaining an undergraduate Master of Arts (MA Hons) degree. After graduation, she joined the Glenrothes Gazette as a trainee reporter. She later moved to Kingdom FM, followed by Real Radio, and finally joined BBC Scotland in late 2002 where she worked as a radio journalist, producer, presenter and reporter. She left the BBC in 2009 to study International Development at the University of Glasgow. She served as a signaller in the 32 Signal Regiment of the Territorial Army for three years (2003–06) before suffering a back injury in a training exercise at Sandhurst.

Entering politics
In 2009, after having left the BBC to study at the University of Glasgow, Davidson joined the Conservative Party. She said she was inspired by a call by David Cameron, the then Leader of the Opposition, in the wake of the United Kingdom parliamentary expenses scandal, for people to get involved in politics who had never previously been political. She was encouraged by the Scottish Conservative Party's Director of Media, Ramsay Jones, to join the party and stand for the House of Commons seat of Glasgow North East at the 2009 by-election, which was triggered by the resignation of Labour MP and Speaker of the House, Michael Martin. She finished in third place, with 1,075 votes (5.2% share of the vote).

In February 2010, she tried to seek the Conservative party candidacy for Bromsgrove in Worcestershire, England. She made the shortlist but in the end lost out to Sajid Javid.

From early 2010 to March 2011, she worked as the head of the private office of the then Scottish Conservative leader, Annabel Goldie. She played a large part in the organisation of campaign media events in the run-up to the 2010 general election, at which she ran again in Glasgow North East, finishing in fourth place with 1,569 votes (a 5.3% share of the vote).

Member of the Scottish Parliament; 2011–2021

Election and first roles

For the 2011 Scottish Parliament election, Davidson was selected in September 2010 to contest the Glasgow Kelvin constituency, and was initially placed second on the Conservatives' Glasgow region list, behind Malcolm Macaskill, a Glasgow businessman and party member for over 30 years. This made it very unlikely that Davidson would gain election to the Scottish Parliament, for the Glasgow regional list typically returned only one Conservative member.
However, with only a couple of months to go, newspaper stories appeared in March 2011 that questioned Macaskill's business history. It was revealed that, ahead of a 2010 internal party selection contest, he had failed to fully disclose his business career to party members. On 24 March, Andrew Fulton, the Chairman of the Scottish Conservatives, decided that Macaskill was to be deselected, thereby promoting Davidson to the first position in the Glasgow regional list. This led to loud protests from the supporters of Macaskill, and some major donors withdrew their financial support for the party. In the event, after coming a distant fourth in Glasgow Kelvin, Davidson was elected to the Scottish Parliament from the Glasgow region list. After the election she was appointed by Goldie as the Conservative spokesperson for Culture, Europe and External Relations.

Leadership of the Scottish Conservative Party

Election bid 

Following the resignation of Annabel Goldie as Scottish Conservative leader on 9 May 2011, Davidson became a contender in the leadership election. Her rivals later claimed that Davidson received assistance from Party headquarters, though her supporters stated that these claims were part of a smear campaign. She stood against three other candidates – Murdo Fraser, Jackson Carlaw and Margaret Mitchell. Fraser stood on a platform of separating the Scottish Conservatives from the UK-wide party and establishing a new Scottish centre-right party. Davidson announced her candidacy on 4 September and vehemently opposed Fraser's proposals to separate the party, calling it a "distraction" which would "tie the party in knots".

Davidson's campaign was endorsed by two MSPs: John Lamont (her campaign manager) and John Scott; and the Conservatives' only Scottish MP and Scotland Office minister, David Mundell. Her campaign was also endorsed by the following party grandees: Sir Albert McQuarrie; The 13th Marquess of Lothian, a former Chairman of the Conservative Party; former Scottish Office minister and Scottish party chairman Lord Sanderson; a former Secretary of State for Scotland, Lord Forsyth; the Leader of the House of Lords, Lord Strathclyde; and former MSP and Holyrood deputy presiding officer Murray Tosh. Despite being a List MSP for Glasgow, she failed to gain the endorsement of a single chairperson of any of the five Conservative Constituency Associations in Glasgow and over half the MSP group had supported Murdo Fraser.

On 11 September 2011, Davidson sacked her election agent and parliamentary assistant Ross McFarlane after he was filmed trying to burn a European Union flag in a Glasgow street following a University Conservative Association (GUCA), St Andrew's Day dinner in November 2010. On 5 October 2011, the Scottish Conservative media director Ramsay Jones was suspended from his duties during the leadership contest, after it was revealed that he had met Davidson and her campaign team in her flat on Sunday, 18 September.

Davidson subsequently won the leadership election and was made the leader of the Scottish Conservatives on 4 November 2011. She gained 2,278 first preference votes out of the 5,676 votes cast, after second preference votes were counted, she won by 2,983 votes to second-placed Murdo Fraser's 2,417. This sparked some discontent within the party, with prominent party supporter Paul McBride resigning from the party and party donor John McGlynn criticised her election, saying that she was elected through 'interference'.

2014 Scottish Independence referendum 

She campaigned for the Union in 2014 because she loved the "wonderful messiness of these islands". Reflecting on the referendum some years later she said, "I think I did cry but I don’t think until a couple of days after. It was a bit delayed, but it was pure relief."

When Alex Salmond resigned as First Minister of Scotland, Davidson nominated herself to succeed him. She knew that the SNP's majority virtually assured that Salmond's successor as SNP leader, Nicola Sturgeon, would become First Minister. Nevertheless, she felt the need to offer "an alternative vision of Scotland".  Davidson received 15 votes to Sturgeon's 66.

In September 2015, following a year-long police investigation into allegations that pro-Union campaigners, including Davidson, had breached secrecy provisions of the Scottish Independence Referendum Act 2013 during the Scottish independence referendum, detectives reported their findings to the Crown Office and Procurator Fiscal Service. Police Scotland stated, in reference to the report, that no evidence of criminality was found, and consequently there was no charge to answer.

Relative success in 2016 and 2017 

Davidson led the Scottish Conservatives into the 2016 Scottish Parliament election, where the party doubled its number of Scottish Parliament seats to 31, replacing Labour as the second largest party at Holyrood behind the Scottish National Party. The election also saw Davidson, who had previously been a list MSP, win the constituency of Edinburgh Central from the SNP with 10,399 votes. Reacting to the result Davidson said, "I am under no illusion that everybody who voted for me in that seat is a true-blue, dyed-in-the wool Tory, and neither are they in places up and down Scotland. They are people who want us to do a very specific job, and that it is to hold the SNP to account."

Following the success of the Scottish Conservatives at the 2016 Scottish election, in which the party doubled its number of MSPs, a Guardian article noted that "some in Westminster see her as a potential future leader, who could broaden the party's appeal and help tackle perceptions it is on the side of the privileged". However, Davidson dismissed the suggestion in an interview with The House magazine, describing the role of Prime Minister as "the loneliest job in the world". But she did not rule out the prospect of becoming an MP, saying she would only do so "for now". In the Conservative leadership contest triggered by the resignation of Prime Minister David Cameron, Davidson gave her backing to Home Secretary Theresa May to succeed him as Conservative Party leader and Prime Minister, describing May as a "proper grown up [who is] best placed to navigate the stormy waters ahead". Davidson was appointed to the Privy Council on 13 July 2016.

At the 2017 local elections, the Scottish Conservatives achieved their best results since devolution gaining 164 seats including some surprise successes in working class neighbourhoods such as Calton in Glasgow’s East End and Ferguslie Park in Paisley (the UK's most deprived ward). The 2017 general election saw the conservatives win 13 seats in Scotland, its best result since 1983. In a election which was not seen as going as well for the Conservatives elsewhere commentators linked  their successes in Scotland to Ruth Davidson personally. She said of the result "Indyref2 is dead... it's time to get back to what matters to the people of Scotland – that's sorting out our schools, growing our economy and looking at our public services."

Resignation 
In 2018, she ruled out running in a future leadership election, saying she valued her mental health "too much". On 29 August 2019, Davidson stood down citing several political and personal reasons for her decision to resign as leader.

Return to backbenches 

After her resignation, Davidson criticised Boris Johnson for suspending 21 Conservative MPs in September 2019 and said he was doing so to make sure that the moderates in his cabinet were replaced by "more compliant Conservatives". She also praised Amber Rudd's decision to leave the cabinet over the "act of political vandalism".

In October 2019, Davidson accepted a public relations role for lobbying firm Tulchan Communications while retaining her job as an MSP. Her employment drew into question potential conflicts of interest and the size of her salary, £50,000 for 25 days' work, in addition to her £63,000-a-year MSP's salary. A week later, she abandoned her taking up of the role after meeting with parliamentary officials, although she insisted no conflict would have emerged had she still taken up the role. Prior to the 2019 general election Davidson said that she would swim naked in Loch Ness if the Scottish National Party won 50 seats, but avoided the ordeal as the SNP won only 48.

In July 2020 during the COVID-19 pandemic, Davidson lobbied for the leadership bid of Douglas Ross after the resignation of Jackson Carlaw who resigned due to Scottish Conservative support falling in polls, pressure from backbenchers and support for Scottish Independence on the rise. Later that month, it was announced she would be given a life peerage. She agreed to serve as Leader of the Conservative Party in the Scottish Parliament until the 2021 Scottish Parliament election, while Ross was yet to be elected to the Scottish Parliament. Ross was announced as leader five days later after running unopposed.

House of Lords 
In July 2021, Davidson entered the House of Lords as Baroness Davidson of Lundin Links, of Lundin Links in the County of Fife. She made her maiden speech on 22 October 2021 when she supported Baroness Meacher's Assisted Dying Bill. In January 2022, it was announced that she would be presenting a weekly programme on Times Radio as from the following month.

Policies and views
Davidson identifies as a "One Nation Conservative" and a centrist, and is seen as being on the socially liberal wing of the Conservative Party. She supports LGBT rights and favoured extending same-sex marriage equality to Northern Ireland. She advocated a "Remain" vote at the 2016 European Union referendum and, after the UK voted to leave the EU, said she wanted the UK to remain part of the European Single Market and Customs Union with reciprocal freedom of movement rights, though she subsequently supported leaving the Customs Union and ending free movement. Following the result of the 2017 United Kingdom general election, in which the Conservative Party lost its parliamentary majority, she said that Prime Minister Theresa May lacked a mandate to take the UK out of the EU Single Market and Customs Union.

Immigration
At the 2016 Conservative Party Conference, Davidson warned her party that "immigrants should be made to feel welcome in the UK" and the "party should not lurch to the right in the wake of Labour's implosion". She argued that Britain should seek access to the European Single Market even if that means accepting reciprocal freedom of movement.

Agriculture 
In an interview with The Times, she refused to commit herself to saying that, in the aftermath of Brexit, Scotland should gain responsibility for Scottish agriculture policy. She suggested that Westminster would take responsibility instead.

Justice and devolution
She supports judges being given the ability to effectively sentence perpetrators of "the most heinous, cruel and vile" crimes with a life sentence, with the intent that they are never released. Davidson also calls for an end to the automatic release of prisoners, and believes that alcohol and drug consumption should not grant more lenient sentencing to people who have committed crimes.

Davidson has stated she wanted the Scottish Parliament to be accountable for up to 40% of what it spends. This was a reversal of a previous view she expressed, as she was elected on a platform that there should be a "line drawn in the sand", as she opposed any further devolution. She later said "Conservatives were wrong to oppose the idea of a Scottish Parliament during the campaign for devolution, which was delivered in 1999."

Business and infrastructure
Davidson has proposed that any start-up company whose rateable value was below £18,000 should be incentivised by being given an initial two-year ability to avoid paying business rates. She also emphasises the necessity for proper infrastructure in rural areas, particularly with regard to ferry links.

She supports the Scottish video games industry and opposed the proposal to deny tax breaks to the industry.

Education and early learning
During her leadership campaign, Davidson stated that in the 0–5 age category, children should be granted more hours in early years centres, so as to meet the needs of "hard-working families". She supports state-funded Roman Catholic schooling in Scotland, and believes the Church of Scotland should open its own faith schools as well.

European Union 
Before the United Kingdom European Union membership referendum held on 23 June 2016, she campaigned against British withdrawal from the European Union. On 21 June 2016, she participated in the BBC's Wembley Arena Debate, as a panellist for the "Remain" campaign with Frances O'Grady and Mayor of London, Sadiq Khan; former Mayor of London and Conservative MP Boris Johnson, Labour MP Gisela Stuart and Conservative MP Andrea Leadsom, who argued on behalf of the "Leave" campaign as part of a cross-party debate. The referendum saw 52% of British voters decide to leave the European Union, while 62% of the Scottish electorate who cast their vote backed remaining in the EU. Years later Davidson reflected: "Turns out we were 4% not good enough – but for such things the world turns – and I'll never quite forgive myself for not getting that 4%."

Following the announcement of the result, First Minister Nicola Sturgeon suggested the constitutional change it would bring about justified the need for a second referendum on Scottish independence, but Davidson said this would not be the answer to concerns raised by the prospect of leaving the European Union: "The 1.6 million votes cast in this referendum in favour of Remain do not wipe away the two million votes that were cast less than two years ago". She also called on the UK and Scottish Governments to work together and put "stability" first.

Ruth Davidson is willing to support a legal challenge in the Supreme Court on the basis of the Scottish Parliament voting to protect what it argued were its existing powers over Brexit. She asserts that the importance of legal action is to test the complex situation in the court.

Social issues
Davidson has stated that she supports same-sex marriage, but believes religious institutions should not be forced to carry out the ceremonies should it conflict with their views. She urged the Republic of Ireland to vote "Yes" in the 2015 constitutional vote to enable same-sex marriage.

2016 Conservative leadership election
 
Following the success of the Scottish Conservatives at the 2016 Scottish election, in which the party doubled its number of MSPs, a Guardian article noted that "some in Westminster see her as a potential future leader, who could broaden the party's appeal and help tackle perceptions it is on the side of the privileged". However, Davidson dismissed the suggestion in an interview with The House magazine, describing the role of Prime Minister as "the loneliest job in the world". But she did not rule out the prospect of becoming an MP, saying she would only do so "for now". In the Conservative leadership contest triggered by the resignation of Prime Minister David Cameron, Davidson gave her backing to Home Secretary Theresa May to succeed him as Conservative Party leader and Prime Minister, describing May as a "proper grown up [who is] best placed to navigate the stormy waters ahead".

Saudi Arabia
After King Abdullah of Saudi Arabia died in January 2015, the UK government decided to hang British flags at half-mast as a sign of mourning. In response, Davidson tweeted: "Flying flags at half-mast on government buildings for the death of a Saudi king is a steaming pile of nonsense. That is all." This tweet was in the context of recent outrage caused by the Kingdom of Saudi Arabia publicly beheading a woman and sentencing a blogger to 1,000 lashes.

Personal life
On 18 February 2015, Davidson appeared in a party election broadcast in which she was seen with her same-sex partner Jen Wilson, a 33-year-old Irish woman from County Wexford. Davidson announced her engagement to Wilson in May 2016. On 26 April 2018 Davidson announced that she had become pregnant after receiving IVF treatment, and that she and Wilson were "excited" to be expecting their first child. On 26 October, Davidson gave birth to a boy at Edinburgh Royal Infirmary.

In a 2015 interview with BBC Radio Scotland, Davidson spoke about struggling with her sexuality: "I struggled with it for a number of years actually before I would admit it to myself, never mind to anybody else. But there comes a point at which you make a decision and that decision is either that you're going to live a lie for the rest of your life, or you're going to trust yourself, and that's what I had to do." In her memoirs, published in 2018 and serialised by The Sunday Times Magazine, Davidson writes of struggling with mental health issues as a teenager, something that she says was triggered by the suicide of a boy in her village. She has said that these struggles almost dissuaded her from running for leadership.

Davidson is a member of the Church of Scotland and counts dog walking, hillwalking and kickboxing as her hobbies. She supports Scottish football team Dunfermline Athletic. On 23 October 2015, Davidson became the first female Scottish politician to appear as a panellist on the BBC One satirical news quiz Have I Got News for You. In 2017, Davidson became Honorary Colonel of 32nd Signal Regiment. Davidson was included in Time magazine's 100 Most Influential People of 2018.

Notes

References

External links

 Official Ruth Davidson Website
 
 Ruth Davidson articles  at Holyrood.com
 Ruth Davidson on LBC

|-

1978 births
Living people
Alumni of the University of Edinburgh
Alumni of the University of Glasgow
BBC Scotland newsreaders and journalists
Conservative MSPs
Female members of the Scottish Parliament
Lesbian politicians
LGBT Calvinist and Reformed Christians
Leaders of the Scottish Conservative Party
Members of the Scottish Parliament 2011–2016
Members of the Scottish Parliament 2016–2021
Members of the Scottish Parliament for Edinburgh constituencies
Members of the Privy Council of the United Kingdom
People from Buckhaven
People from Selkirk, Scottish Borders
Royal Corps of Signals soldiers
Scottish Conservative Party parliamentary candidates
Scottish Presbyterians
Scottish radio presenters
Scottish radio producers
British women television journalists
Scottish women radio presenters
Scottish women television presenters
Women opposition leaders
LGBT members of the Scottish Parliament
LGBT military personnel
Life peeresses created by Elizabeth II
Mental health activists
Women radio producers
LGBT life peers